WMOP is a commercial radio station in Ocala, Florida, broadcasting to the Gainesville-Ocala, Florida area on 900 AM. WMOP is the Fox Sports Radio affiliate for Ocala; additionally, it produces local content which is also broadcast on Gainesville station WRBD, owned by the same company and co-marketed together with WMOP as "Florida Sports Talk Radio". WMOP originally signed on in 1953. The current sports format began in 1996.

WMOP is the only full-time sports station in Ocala.

From 1961 to 1985, WMOP(AM) had an FM sister station at 93.7 FM, which was then WFUZ, and is now known as WOGK.  WMOP previously also simulcast on translator W261BA 100.1 FM in Ocala.

External links
History of WMOP from Central Florida Radio

MOP
Radio stations established in 1953
1953 establishments in Florida